Kid's Community College, also referred to as KCC, is a public charter school and private preschool based in Riverview, Florida. Established in 2003 by Timothy B. Kilpatrick, Sr., Kid's Community College provides educational services and care for children six weeks of age through grade 12.

History
In March 2003, Timothy B. Kilpatrick, Sr. founded the first Kid's Community College (KCC) preschool campus in Riverview, Florida. During the 2005-2006 school year, Kilpatrick expanded the KCC educational offerings to include the Kid's Community College Elementary Charter School, serving grades kindergarten through fifth. Kid's Community College Franchises formed on November 21, 2006, and began offering KCC preschool franchises in November 2007. During the 2009-2010 school year, the Kid's Community College Middle Charter School (KCCMCS) opened its doors providing services for sixth grade, grew to sixth and seventh grade in 2010-2011, and expanded to sixth through eighth grade in 2011-2012. In October 2010, the Kid's Community College Elementary Orange County campus was approved and opened for the 2012-2013 school year in Orange County (Orlando), Florida.

As of December 2017, there were eight KCC schools serving PreK through K12 students in Hillsborough and Orange counties.  KCC subscribes to the Multiple Intelligence Theory of Howard Gardner, offers full PYP International Baccalaureate programs and one national and one international accreditations.

The KCC System
Prior to opening KCC in 2003, Kilpatrick collaborated with several child development graduate students to create the Kid's Community College 1st Degree Learning System. The system incorporates the Multiple Intelligence Principles of Howard Gardner with a differentiated, individual, and developmentally appropriate approach. Students are tested in the beginning of the school year using a number of measures including the Multiple Intelligence Development Assessment Scales (MIDAS). The MIDAS results indicate the individual learning modality of each student.  KCC teachers then use the MIDAS and other assessments to tailor their classroom lesson plans to meet the individual learning styles of each child.  Included in the 1st Degree Learning System are Individual Development and Education Plans (IDEPs) for every enrolled student. The IDEPs are completed three times throughout the school year through parent and teacher collaborations.  Three goals are chosen for each student to accomplish with assistance of individual lesson plans created by the teacher specifically for each student's goal. The 1st Degree Learning System forms the foundation for the Kid's Community College mission statement, "dedicated to the well-being and educational success of EVERY child." The system is implemented with each student at each campus, preschool through high school.

Campuses

As of December 2017, there were six Kid's Community College campuses: Kid's Community College-Lake Saint Charles Preschool, Kid's Community College Riverview South Preschool, Kid's Community College Orange County VPK, Kid's Community College Elementary Charter School Riverview, Kid's Community College Southeast Elementary IB World School, Kid's Community College Southeast Middle Charter School Riverview, Kid's Community College Preparatory High School and Kid's Community College Orange County.

KCC Lake Saint Charles Preschool
Kid's Community College Lake Saint Charles (KCC-LSC) campus was established in 2003 within the Lake Saint Charles community located in Riverview, Florida. The  facility housed 13 employees and 67 preschool children ranging from 4-months to five years of age and includes an after school program for elementary children. The KCC-LSC preschool campus has held an active accreditation with the National Accreditation Commission (NAC) since 2005 with reaccreditation extending through 2018. It is also an active Voluntary Prekindergarten Program (VPK) since 2005, scoring some of the highest kindergarten readiness rates in Hillsborough County. VPK Provider Kindergarten Readiness Rate. Since its inception in 2003, the KCC-LSC campus has participated in the School Readiness Program providing subsidized child care for families receiving temporary cash assistance and meet federal work participation requirements. As of 2011, the campus had a 4 out of 5 star rating through the Quality Counts for Kids Program.  In September 2017, the LSC Preschool moved into a state-of-the-art facility shared with KCC Prep High.

KCC Riverview South Preschool
KCC Preschool Riverview South was established in 2012 and is located in the emergent Southern part of Riverview, Florida. The RS facility houses 15 employees and 75 preschool children ranging from one to five years of age and includes VPK and an after school program.  The RS campus is an expansion of its nearby LSC campus and shares the KCC tradition of high- performance and stellar program offerings.

As of 2011, the KCC-RS campus was franchise owned and operated by Vandrese and Michael Williams, DBA Adventures-n-Babysitting, Inc.

KCC Riverview South Campus, Riverview, FL
Kid's Community College Riverview South Charter School, a tuition-free campus, was established in 2005 within the Lake Saint Charles community located in Riverview, Florida. The campus initially served 54 students in kindergarten through second grade and expanded to a complete elementary school by the 2008-2009 school year, serving 348 students in grades kindergarten through fifth. In 2012, the school moved into a newly constructed, 40,000sf facility at 10030 Mathog Road in Riverview. Riverview South was recognized as a high-performing charter school by the State of Florida, has received numerous awards and Governor recognitions for student achievement, many athletic championships and as of 2014, it had a B grade. Florida School Grade  The Riverview South campus has also achieved and maintained accreditation since 2010 through the North Central Association Commission on Accreditation and School Improvement (NCA-CASI). Riverview South is in its 12th year as a free public Hillsborough County elementary school of choice.  Prior to

KCC Middle Charter School, Riverview FL
The Kid's Community College Middle Charter School (KCCMCS) tuition-free campus was established in 2009 in Riverview, Florida. The campus initially served 22 students in sixth grade and expanded to a complete middle school by the 2011-2012 school year, serving 198 students in grades sixth through eighth.  KCCMCS is an "A" rated school that consistently performs as one of the highest middle schools in Hillsborough County.  It merged with KCC Elementary in 2015-16 to form KCC Riverview South.

KCC Elementary Orange County, Ocoee, FL
The Orange County School Board approved the Kid's Community College Elementary Orange County Campus on October 2010.  The tuition-free campus opened during the 2012-2013 school year and as of 2017, it was serving 266 students in grades kindergarten through fourth grade.  In 2014, KCC Orange students ranked 2nd in proficiency of all elementary schools in Orange County of FCAT 2.0 reading.

KCC Riverview Southeast IB Elementary and Middle Schools, Riverview, FL 
KCC RSE International Baccalaureate school represents KCC's first tuition-free, public international educational offering.  The school moved into a state-of-the-art campus in the summer of 2012 and as of 2014, it was serving 260 IB students in grades kindergarten through fifth grade.  The campus has an active waiting list of more than 600 students and is fully authorized by the IBO World Organization for its PYP programming.

KCC RSE Middle School is in the authoring process of IB candidacy and serves 6th though 8th grade students in its new 17,000sf facility next door to the elementary campus.

KCC Preparatory High School, Riverview, FL 
KCC Preparatory High School opened its doors in the fall of 2017 in a new 30,000sf technically advanced campus in Lake Saint Charles.

The mission of Kid’s Community College® Charter High school (KCCHS) is to provide high school students with the highest quality individualized education possible by offering a proven system of learning taught to the specific learning modality of each student we serve, using Howard Gardner's Multiple Intelligence Theory as the basis of our educational approach. KCCHS will integrate curricula and Next Generation Sunshine State Standards and Florida Standards with Multiple Intelligence Development Assessment Scales (MIDAS) to develop Individual Development and Education Plans (IDEPs) that are used to instruct to the unique learning modality of each student. The MIDAS profile and IDEP serve as the BEGINNING of a dialogue that maximizes motivation, allows the formation of action plans to focus efforts and for the most effective use of the curricula for the each student.

As only 1 of 5 NAF preparatory academies in Hillsborough County, KCCHS aims to answer the call for a higher standard in individualized high school education and will be recognized as a first-class character building and learning educational environment that prepares its students to excel as exemplary citizens who fully understand their individual learning styles, enjoy learning, are able to engage in critical thinking, and who demonstrate complete academic mastery and leadership skills to become successful, productive and contributing high school graduates.  National Academy Foundation (NAF) academies solve some of the biggest challenges facing education and the economy by bringing education, business and community leaders together to transform the high school experience. This preparation is essential if high school students wish to effectively compete for college placement and careers. In Hillsborough County, as of 2017, there were only 5 schools designated to be NAF Academy schools. Kid’s Community College Preparatory Charter High School is proud to be one of them.

Kid's Community College Franchises
Kid's Community College Franchises formed on November 21, 2006, and began offering KCC preschool franchises in November 2007. Only a select group of 85 Kid's Community College Franchises will be awarded in the Eastern U.S.

Awards 

 2005 - Best Places to Work Finalist
 2007 - Small Business of the Year Award
 2007 - Congressional Award Recipient
 2007 - Best Places to Work Finalist
 2008 - Best Places to Work Finalist
 2008 - Best of Riverview Award in the Private and Parochial Schools Category by the US Local Business Association
 2009 - Best Places to Work 2nd Place Winner
 2009 - Ultimate Management Teams
 2010-2014 Top 100 Best Places to Work Award Recipient - Florida Trend Magazine

External links

References 

Private schools in Florida
Charter schools in Florida
Public middle schools in Florida
Public elementary schools in Florida